Trivirostra elongata is a species of small sea snail, a marine gastropod mollusk in the family Triviidae, also known as the false cowries or trivias.

Etymology

References

Triviidae
Gastropods described in 1997